Edward Douglas-Pennant may refer to:

 Edward Douglas-Pennant, 1st Baron Penrhyn (1800–1886), Scottish landowner in Wales, and politician
 Edward Douglas-Pennant, 3rd Baron Penrhyn (1864–1927), British politician